Thoracic splanchnic nerves are splanchnic nerves that arise from the sympathetic trunk in the thorax and travel inferiorly to provide sympathetic supply to the abdomen. The nerves contain preganglionic sympathetic fibers and general visceral afferent fibers.

Nerves 
There are three main thoracic splanchnic nerves.

Additional images

References

External links
  – "The position of the right and left vagus nerves, and sympathetic trunks in the mediastinum."
  – "Posterior Abdominal Wall: The Celiac Plexus"
 
 

Sympathetic nervous system